Black Tide is a heavy metal band formed in Miami, Florida, US in 2004 by lead guitarist and vocalist Gabriel Garcia. In 2008 the band released their debut album Light from Above which charted at number 73 on the Billboard 200, with 11,400 copies sold in its first week of sales. It spawned the successful single "Shockwave". After touring with bands like Avenged Sevenfold and Bullet for My Valentine the band released the single "Bury Me". Their second album, Post Mortem, was released on August 23, 2011. The album charted at number 73 on the Billboard 200.

Studio albums

Extended plays

Singles

Music videos

Other appearances

References

External links
 Official website

Discographies of American artists